The 2015–16 Georgia State Panthers women's basketball team represented Georgia State University in the 2015–16 NCAA Division I women's basketball season. The Panthers, coached by Sharon Baldwin-Tener, were a member of the Sun Belt Conference, and played their home games on campus at the GSU Sports Arena.

Roster

Schedule

|-
!colspan=9 style="background:#003399; color:#FFFFFF;"| Non-conference regular season

|-
!colspan=9 style="background:#003399; color:#FFFFFF;"| Sun Belt regular season

References

Georgia State
Georgia State Panthers women's basketball seasons